Charles III de Bourbon (c. 1554 - June 15, 1610), was Archbishop of Rouen, and the illegitimate son of Antoine de Bourbon, king of Navarre, and his mistress Louise de La Béraudière du Rouhet. His half-brother was King Henry IV of France.

Biography 
On 13 March 1569, Charles was captured by the Catholic forces at the battle of Jarnac. Later that year, he became Bishop of Comminges, then officially bishop of Lectoure in 1590. In both circumstances Charles was an "administrator", since he did not seek to intervene in political or religious life unlike his predecessors. His half-brother Henry tried to establish him as archbishop of Reims in 1591 but he was unable to remove the ecclesiastical see from the control of the House of Guise.

Following Philippe Desportes's refusal of archiepiscopal seat of Rouen, Charles, who was quickly ordained a priest, was elevated to Archbishop of Rouen in 1594. In 1599 at the behest of his half-brother Henry, he officiated the wedding of his half-sister Catherine de Bourbon and Henry II, Duke of Lorraine. After briefly making a suggestion to hold the ceremony privately in the king's study, Charles, being overruled, performed the ceremony as instructed. 

He kept his position until his resignation in 1604 in favor of Cardinal Francois de Joyeuse. In 1604, he became Abbott of Marmoutier, and was buried there in 1610.

Notes

References

Sources

1550s births
1610 deaths

Year of birth uncertain
Archbishops of Rouen